Adrian Anantawan is a Canadian violinist. Anantawan, who began studying violin at age nine, has performed with the Toronto Symphony Orchestra and at the White House. He is an alumnus of the Etobicoke School of the Arts in Canada, the Curtis Institute of Music in Philadelphia, Yale University and the Harvard Graduate School of Education. Growing up in the neighbourhood of Clarkson, in Mississauga, Ontario, Canada, he attended St. Christopher's Elementary School, and is a member of the St. Christopher's Church Parish. He is currently a member of the Anne-Sophie Mutter Foundation and is the Chair of Music at Milton Academy and Artistic Director of Shelter Music Boston.

Biography
He was born in Canada to Thai dad and Hong Konger mom. Anantawan grew up in Toronto and began his violin training, at the age of nine, in Mississauga with violinist Peggy Hills, and later under violist Mark Childs in Toronto.

In 1999 and 2000, Anantawan earned positions with the National Youth Orchestra of Canada, becoming one of its youngest members both years.
	
Throughout his musical career, Anantawan has won many music awards and has received numerous recognitions. He has been profiled by CBC, CTV, YTV, CityTV, TVO, and many major newspapers and magazines. In 2001, Anantawan received the Mississauga Arts Council Emerging Music Talent award and the YTV (Canada) Young Achiever award. In 2002, he received the Starling Award for promising young soloist from the Meadowmount School of Music, founded by Ivan Galamian. In the same year, he won the International Rosemary Kennedy Award and debuted at the Kennedy Center, Washington D.C. In 2005, he received the CBC Galaxie Rising Star Award.
     
      
In 2006, after enjoying a full merit scholarship, Anantawan graduated from the world-renowned Curtis Institute of Music in Philadelphia. While there, he studied under Ida Kavafian and Yumi Ninomiya Scott. In the summers of 2004, 2005 and 2006, he was awarded scholarships to the National Arts Center Young Artist Program and studied with Pinchas Zukerman., where he now serves as an instructor in its pre-college division. Summer of 2006 and January 2007 also saw Anantawan with a full scholarship at the Perlman School of Music under Itzhak Perlman.

Anantawan has been performing regularly since 2001. He soloed with orchestras throughout Canada and the US. He represented the Canada Cultural Showcase at the 2004 Paralympic Games in Athens, Greece  and at the Opening Ceremonies of the Vancouver Winter Games in 2010. In November 2005, he debuted with the Toronto Symphony under the direction of Peter Oundjian. In the spring of 2006, his recital at the Glenn Gould Studio for CBC Radio 2 - "Music Around Us" was broadcast live nationally. In September 2006 he performed at the White House to help launch the President's Global Cultural Initiative.

Anantawan has also performed for Pope John Paul II, Christopher Reeve and the Dalai Lama.

In 2008, he completed his master's degree in Music with a full scholarship at Yale University under Peter Oundjian. Anantawan was inducted into Terry Fox Hall of Fame in 2008, Toronto.

Disability activism
Anantawan was born without a right hand. He is an active member and spokesperson for the CHAMP (Child Amputee) Program of The War Amps and Bloorview Kids Rehab Center in Toronto. He recently completed a project involving the use of adaptive musical instruments in classical performance, culminating in the world-premiere of the Virtual Music Instrument with the Montreal Chamber Orchestra.

Inducted into Terry Fox Hall of Fame, Toronto, 2008
White House appearance in the presence of the First Lady to help launch the Global Cultural Initiative, sponsored by VSA arts, 2006
Juno Nominee for Best Children Album "A Butterfly in Time", 2006
National broadcast of TSO debut concert by CBC, January 1, 2006
National broadcast of Glenn Gould Studio recital, Music around Us by CBC, 2006
Nominee for Terry Fox Hall of Fame, 2005
Galaxie Rising Star Award, CBC, 2005
Starling Award for Most Promising Young Soloist, 2005
Awarded the use of a 1698 Amati violin, 2004 – present
Gold, and Grand Awards, International Mercury Film Festival, 2003 (profile)
Gold, and Gold Special Jury's Awards, Worldfest, Houston, 2003 (profile)
VSA arts Rosemary Kennedy International Young Soloist Award, 2002
Kids Hall of Fame Inductee, N.Y., 2001
Young Achiever Award YTV (YAPS to the Max), 2001
Mississauga Art Council Emerging Music Award, 2001
Member of NYO of Canada, placed second in the nationwide audition, 2000
One of the youngest violinists accepted by the NYO of Canada, 1999

Media coverage

Has been profiled by newspapers such as Toronto Star, The Globe and Mail, National, the Sun, Mississauga News, The Washington Post, The Philadelphia Inquirer, South Mississippi News, New Hampshire, etc., 1999 – present
His profiles on television include:
Profile, Fairchild Television, Dec 2006
One on One with Paula Todd, TVO, Jan/2006
W5, Help & Hope CTV, March/2005
PBA profile for the War Amps, all channels, 2002 – present
"Gift" Supper Gala, National News, CTV, CBC, City TV, Global, 2004
"The Daily Planet" Discovery Channel, 2004
Idea City 02, City TV, June/2002
Moving On, CBC, 2001
YAPS to the Max, YTV, 2000
Special documentary entitled 'The Story Behind The Notes', premiered on The Documentary Channel, June 30/2008

References

External links
 Chris Clay, "Be fearless when making music Mississauga violinist tells students", Mississauga News, 5 December 2016.

Date of birth missing (living people)
1983 births
Living people
Musicians from Mississauga
Canadian people of Chinese descent
Canadian people of Thai descent
Canadian classical violinists
Male classical violinists
Canadian Disability Hall of Fame
Yale School of Music alumni
Curtis Institute of Music alumni
Harvard Graduate School of Education alumni
Canadian amputees
21st-century classical violinists
21st-century Canadian violinists and fiddlers
Canadian male violinists and fiddlers